Ivor Dangerfield (16 December 1918 – 9 October 2010) was an Australian rules footballer for the Port Adelaide Football Club during the late 1930s and through the 1940s.

References 

Port Adelaide Football Club players (all competitions)
1918 births
2010 deaths